Wahhab is a name of God in Islam, meaning "the Bestower". It is also used as a personal name, as a short form of Abd al-Wahhab - the "Servant of the Bestower".

In the Qur'an
Appears three times in the Qur'an:

See also
 Abdul Wahhab

References

Names of God in Islam